This is a list of professorships at the University of Oxford. During the early history of the university, the title of professor meant a doctor who taught. From the 16th century, it was used for those holding a professorship, also known as a chair. The university has sometimes created professorships for an individual, the chair coming to an end when that individual dies or retires, and now awards titular professorships in the form of Titles of Distinction: these are not listed here. The Regius Professorships are royal chairs created by a reigning monarch. The first five (in civil law, divinity, medicine, Hebrew and Greek) are sometimes called the Henrician chairs.

Professorships

Abdulaziz Saud AlBabtain Laudian Professor of Arabic
Action Research Professor of Clinical Neurology
Agnelli-Serena Professor of Italian Studies
Alastair Buchan Professor of International Relations
Allen & Overy Professor of Corporate Law
American Standard Companies Professor of Operations Management
Andreas Idreos Professor of Science and Religion
Andrew W. Mellon Professor of American Government
Anne T. and Robert M. Bass Professorship of Developmental and Stem Cell Biology as Applied to Medicine
Barclay-Williams Professor of Molecular Immunology
Barnett Professor of Social Policy
Beit Professor of the History of the British Commonwealth
Blavatnik Professor of Government and Public Policy
Blavatnik Professor of Public Policy
Boden Professor of Sanskrit
BP Professor of Economics
BP Professor of Information Engineering
British Heart Foundation Professor of Cardiovascular Physiology
Brownlee-Abraham Professor of Molecular Biology
BT Professor of Major Programme Management
Bywater and Sotheby Professor of Byzantine and Modern Greek Language and Literature
Calouste Gulbenkian Professor of Armenian Studies
Camden Professor of Ancient History
Cameron Mackintosh Visiting Professor of Contemporary Theatre
Cancer Research UK Professor of Medical Oncology
César Milstein Professor of Cancer Cell Biology
Charles Simonyi Professor of the Public Understanding of Science
Cheryl and Reece Scott Professor of Psychiatry
Chichele Professors
Chichele Professor of Economic History
Chichele Professor of Medieval History
Chichele Professor of Public International Law
Chichele Professor of Social and Political Theory
Chichele Professor of the History of War
Climax Professor of Clinical Therapeutics
Corpus Christi Professor of Latin
Coulson Professor of Theoretical Chemistry
David Phillips Professor of Molecular Biophysics
Dean Ireland's Professor of the Exegesis of Holy Scripture
Diebold Professor of Comparative Philology
Donald H Perkins Professor of Experimental Physics
Donald Pollock Professor of Chemical Engineering
Donald Schultz Professor of Turbomachinery
Dr Lee's Professors
Dr Lee's Professor of Anatomy
Dr Lee's Professor of Experimental Philosophy (Physics)
Dr Lee's Professor of Chemistry
Drue Heinz Professor of American Literature
Drummond Professor of Political Economy
Dubai Ports World Professorship of Entrepreneurship and Innovation
E.P. Abraham Professor of Cell Biology
E.P. Abraham Professor of Chemical Pathology
E.P. Abraham Professor of Mechanistic Cell Biology
Edgeworth Professor of Economics
Edward Grey Professor of Field Ornithology
Edward Hall Professor of Archaeological Science
Edward Orsborn Professorship of US Politics and Political History
Ernest Butten Professor of Management Studies
Field Marshal Alexander Professor of Cardiovascular Medicine
Freshfields Professorship of Commercial Law
George Eastman Visiting Professor
Gladstone Professor of Government
Glaxo Professor of Cellular Pathology
Goldsmiths' Professor of English Literature
Halford Mackinder Professor of Geography
Halley Professor of Physics
Hans Krebs Professor of Physiological Metabolism
Harold Vyvyan Harmsworth Professor of American History
Heather Professor of Music
Henry Moseley Centenary Professor of Experimental Physics
Herbert Dunhill Professor of Neuro-imaging
Herbert Smith Professor of English Private Law
His Highness Sheikh Hamad Bin Khalifa Al Thani Professor in Contemporary Islamic Studies
Hoffmann and Action Medical Research Professor in Developmental Medicine
Hooke Professor of Experimental Physics
Hope Professor of Zoology (Entomology)
Ieoh Ming Pei Professor in Islamic Art and Architecture
Isaac Wolfson Professor of Materials
Iveagh Professor of Microbial Biochemistry
J. R. R. Tolkien Professor of English Literature and Language
Jacques Delors Professor of European Community Law
James Meade Professor of Economics
Jeremy Griffiths Professor of Medieval English Palaeography
Jesus Professor of Celtic
John Gilbert Winant Visiting Professor of American Government
Kadoorie Professor of Trauma Rehabilitation
Khalid bin Abdullah Al Saud Professor for the Study of the Contemporary Arab World
King Alfonso XIII Professor of Spanish Studies
King John II Professor of Portuguese Studies
Lady Margaret Professor of Divinity
Laing O'Rourke/RAEng Professor of Automation in Construction
Lee Placito Professor of Gastroenterological Disease
Lester B. Pearson Professor of International Relations
Linacre Professor of Zoology
Lincoln Professor of Classical Archaeology and Art
Linklaters Professor of Comparative Law
L'Oréal Professor of Marketing
Luc Hoffmann Professor of Field Ornithology
Man Professor of Quantitative Finance
Margaret Ogilvie's Professor of Ophthalmology
Marshal Foch Professor of French Literature
Masoumeh and Fereydoon Soudavar Professor of Persian Studies
May Professor of Medicine
Merton Professors
Merton Professor of English Language and Literature
Merton Professor of English Literature
Michael Davys Professor of Neuroscience
Montague Burton Professor of International Relations
Newton-Abraham Visiting Professor
Nissan Professor of Modern Japanese Studies
Nolloth Professor of the Philosophy of the Christian Religion
Norman  Professor of Musculo-skeletal Pathology
Nuffield Professors
Nuffield Professor of Anaesthetic Science
Nuffield Professor of Clinical Medicine
Nuffield Professor of Comparative Politics
Nuffield Professor of Economics
Nuffield Professor of Obstetrics and Gynaecology
Nuffield Professor of Orthopaedic Surgery
Nuffield Professor of Pathology
Nuffield Professor of Political Theory
Nuffield Professor of Population Health
Nuffield Professor of Primary Care Health Sciences
Nuffield Professor of Sociology
Nuffield Professor of Surgery
Numata Professorship of Buddhist Studies
Oriel and Laing Professor of the Interpretation of Holy Scripture
Osler Professor of Medicine
Peter Moores Professor of Management Studies
Philip Wetton Professor of Astrophysics
Pinsent Masons Professor of Taxation Law
Professor of the Study of the Abrahamic Religions
Professor of Ancient Philosophy
Professor of Applied Statistics
Professor of Bibliography and Modern Book History
Professor of Bioinformatics
Professor of Biological Anthropology
Professor of Biomaterials
Professor of Biomedical Engineering
Professor of Biostatistics in Genomics
Professor of British and Irish Poetry
Professor of Cancer Biology
Professor of Cancer Genetics
Professor of Cardiovascular Medicine
Professor of Chemical Biology
Professor of Child and Adolescent Psychiatry
Professor of Civil Engineering
Professor of Clinical Biochemistry
Professor of Clinical Geratology
Professor of Computational Aerothermal Engineering
Professor of Computing
Professor of Computing Science
Professor of Computing Systems
Professor of Contemporary Archaeology
Professor of Control Engineering
Professor of Criminology
Professor of Development and Reproduction
Professor of Development Economics
Professor of Diabetic Medicine
Professor of Disease Genomics
Professor of Ear, Nose and Throat Surgery
Professor of Economic and Social History
Professor of Economic History
Professor of Egyptology
Professor of Electrical Engineering
Professor of Energy Materials
Professor of English Law
Professor of Environment and Public Policy
Professor of Epidemiology
Professor of European Archaeology
Professor of Evidence-Based Intervention and Policy Evaluation
Professor of Evolutionary Ecology
Professor of French Literature
Professor of Genetics
Professor of Genomics and Global Health
Professor of Geochemistry
Professor of Geography
Professor of Geology
Professor of Geophysics
Professor of Geosystem Sciences
Professor of Medieval German
Professor of Gynaecological Cancer
Professor of Human Geography
Professor of Indian History and Culture
Professor of Informatics
Professor of Inorganic Chemistry
Professor of Integrative Systems Biology
Professor of Intellectual Property and Information
Professor of Internet Governance and Regulation
Professor of Internet Studies
Professor of Irish History
Professor of Jurisprudence
Professor of Law and Finance
Professor of Linguistics
Professor of Marketing
Professor of Materials Engineering
Professor of Materials Modelling
Professor of Mathematical Biology
Professor of Mathematical Finance
Professor of Mathematical Logic
Professor of Mathematical Modelling
Professor of Mathematics and its Applications
Professor of Mechanical Engineering
Professor of Metabolic Endocrinology
Professor of Microbiology
Professor of Modern History
Professor of Molecular and Population Genetics
Professor of Molecular Medicine
Professor of Musculo-skeletal Pathology
Professor of Musculoskeletal Sciences
Professor of Nanomaterials
Professor of Neuroimmunology
Professor of Neuropathology
Professor of Numerical Analysis
Professor of Old Age Psychiatry
Professor of Orthopaedic Trauma Surgery
Professor of Paediatric Neuroimaging
Professor of Paediatric Neuromuscular Disease
Professor of Pathology
Professor of Pharmacology
Professor of Physical Geography
Professor of Poetry
Professor of Primary Care Health Sciences
Professor of Psychology
Whitehead Professor of Pure Mathematics
Professor of Radiation Oncology and Biology
Professor of Respiratory Medicine
Professor of Russian
Professor of Science and Civilisation
Professor of Scientific Visualisation
Professor of Social Policy
Professor of Social Psychiatry
Professor of Society and the Internet
Professor of Socio-Legal Studies
Professor of Sociology
Professor of Sociology and Social Policy
Professor of Statistical Science
Professor of Statistics in the Social Sciences
Professor of Sustainable Energy Engineering
Professor of Technology and Social Change
Professor of the Analysis of Partial Differential Equations
Professor of the Archaeology of the Roman Empire
Professor of the History of Art
Professor of the History of Latin America
Professor of the History of Science
Professor of the Philosophy of Law
Professor of the Physical Examination of Materials
Professor of the Romance Languages
Professor of the Study of Contemporary China
Professor of Translational Cognitive Neuroscience
Professor of Transplantation
Professor of Zoology
Professors (four) of Economics
Professors (four) of Education
Professors (two) of Management Studies
Professors (two) of Social Anthropology
Professors (two) of Statistics
Radcliffe Professor of Medicine
Radcliffe Professor of Pathology
Rawlinson and Bosworth Professor of Anglo-Saxon
Regius Professors
Regius Professor of Civil Law
Regius Professor of Divinity
Regius Professor of Ecclesiastical History
Regius Professor of Greek
Regius Professor of Hebrew
Regius Professor of History
Regius Professor of Mathematics
Regius Professor of Medicine
Regius Professor of Moral and Pastoral Theology
Rhodes Professor of American History
Rhodes Professor of Experimental Therapeutics and Clinical Pharmacology
Rhodes Professor of Race Relations
Rhodes Professor of the Laws of the British Commonwealth and the United States
Richard Doll Professorship of Epidemiology and Medicine
Robert Turner Professor of Diabetic Medicine
Rouse Ball Professor of Mathematics
Rupert Murdoch Professor of Language and Communication
Savilian Professor of Astronomy
Savilian Professor of Geometry
Sedleian Professor of Natural Philosophy
Sekyra and White's Professor of Moral Philosophy
Shaw Professor of Chinese
Sherardian Professor of Botany
Sibthorpian Professor of Plant Science
Sidney Truelove Professor of Gastroenterology
Sir John Hicks Professor of Economics
Slade Professor of Fine Art
Spalding Professor of Eastern Religions and Ethics
Tasso Leventis Chair of Biodiversity
Taylor Professor of the German Language and Literature
Technikos Professor of Biomedical Engineering
Technology Law
Thomas Warton Professor of English Literature
Vesuvius Professorship of Materials
Vinerian Professor of English Law
Visiting Professor of Opera Studies
W.A. Handley Professor of Psychiatry
Wallis Professor of Mathematics
Watts Professor of Psychology
Waynflete Professors
Waynflete Professor of Chemistry
Waynflete Professor of Metaphysical Philosophy
Waynflete Professor of Physiology
Waynflete Professor of Pure Mathematics
Whitley Professor of Biochemistry
Wilde Professor of Mental Philosophy
Wood Professor of Forest Science
Wykeham Professors
Wykeham Professor of Ancient History
Wykeham Professor of Logic
Tencent-Wykeham Professor of Physics

See also
 Title of Distinction

References

 
Oxford
 
Professorships